The  were a series of popular disturbances that erupted throughout Japan from July to September 1918, which brought about the collapse of the Terauchi Masatake administration.

Causes
A precipitous rise in the price of rice caused extreme economic hardship, particularly in rural areas where rice was the main staple of life. Farmers, who compared the low prices they were receiving from government regulation with the high market prices, had tremendous hostility to rice merchants and government officials, who had allowed the consumer price to spiral out of control. The inflation came in the early-20th-century inflationary spiral, which also affected most consumer goods and rents, and so urban dwellers also had considerable scope for grievances. The Siberian Intervention further inflamed the situation, with the government buying up existing rice stocks to support the troops overseas, which further drove rice prices even higher. The government intervention in economic affairs (low regulated rice prices) caused rural protests to spread to towns and cities.

Riots
The rice riots were unparalleled in modern Japanese history in terms of scope, size, and violence. The initial protest occurred in the small fishing town of Uozu, Toyama Prefecture, on 23 July 1918. It started with peaceful petitioning but quickly escalated to riots, strikes, looting, incendiary bombings of police stations and government offices, and armed clashes. In 1918, there were 417 separate disputes involving more than 66,000 workers. Some 25,000 people were arrested, of whom 8,200 were convicted of various crimes, with punishments ranging from minor fines to the death penalty.

Taking responsibility for the collapse of public order, Japanese Prime Minister Terauchi and his cabinet resigned on 21 September 1918.

A link to Japanese imperialism is debated. Scholars argue that to alleviate the demand for rice, which exceeded the production capabilities of Japan at the time, colonial rice production in Taiwan and Korea was intensified.

See also
 List of food riots

References

Further reading

1918 in Japan
1918 riots
August 1918 events
Empire of Japan
Food riots
July 1918 events
Rebellions in Japan
Riots and civil disorder in Japan
September 1918 events